Alfa Lum was an Italian professional cycling team that existed from 1982 to 1990. The team is best remembered for introducing many successful riders from the former Soviet Union in 1989 and 1990. The team rode in a riding kit of distinctive red and white horizontal stripes. The team sponsored Italian company of Alfa Lum, an aluminium door and windows manufacturer.

History 
The team was formed in 1982 with Alfa Lum as the main sponsor, it was a modest team which consisted of mainly Italian riders along with the Australian Micheal Wilson and the Swede Anders Adamsson. In 1983 the team was strengthened considerably as Italian bicycle manufacturers Olmo were brought on board as co-sponsors and Spanish rider Marino Lejarreta who had won the 1982 edition of the Vuelta a España was introduced to the squad as team leader. Marino brought along his brother Ismael to the team. In 1983 Marino Lejarreta finished second in the Vuelta a España for the Alfa Lum-Olmo team, in 1984 the team were invited to ride the Giro d'Italia and Lejarreta finished 4th overall and took a stage win.

Alfa Lum returned as the main sponsor in 1988, taking over from Ecoflam team when the sponsors pulled out at the end of 1987. The rising star of the team was 23-year-old Maurizio Fondriest who had won a stage of the Volta a Catalunya the previous season and had some good placings in other highly ranked races. Fondriest performed beyond all expectations in 1988 culminating when he surprisingly won the World Championship Road Race in Ronse, Belgium in August. Fondriest also won stages in Tirreno–Adriatico and the Tour de Suisse, as well as the GP Prato for the team that year.

At the end of 1988, Fondriest not unsurprisingly left Alfa Lum to join the Del Tongo team and the rest of the Italians also departed, leaving Alfa Lum to completely rebuild for 1989. They did this by importing fifteen riders from the Soviet Union which had decided to lift its ban on riders turning professional. This turned out to be an inspired action by Alfa Lum as riders such as the veteran Sergei Sukhoruchenkov, the 1980 Olympic road race champion were brought into the squad. However, there were many younger riders who performed admirably and went on to have much success riding for western European teams.

The team rode in 1989 and 1990 with it Soviet riders and introduced riders such as Andrei Tchmil, Piotr Ugrumov, Djamolidine Abdoujaparov, Viktor Klimov, Dimitri Konyshev, Vladimir Poulnikov, Ivan Ivanov to the sport. Over the two years the team had much success and surprised the cycling world. Klimov held the leader's jersey for five days in the 1990 Vuelta a Espana. Poulnikov finished fourth overall in the 1990 Giro d’Italia. Asyat Saitov won a stage in the 1990 Vuelta a España, Konyshev finished second in the 1989 UCI Road World Championships road race in Chambéry, France.

At the end of 1990 Alfa Lum left cycling sponsorship and the team folded. Many of the riders made moves to bigger teams and had outstanding success in the years to come. Poulnikov and Abdoujaparov moved to Carrera, with “Abdou” taking the Green jersey in the Tour de France in 1991, 1993 and 1994. Ugroumov moved to the Spanish team SEUR along with Klimov and Ivanov, Ugroumov won two Alpine stages in the 1994 Tour de France and finished second to Miguel Indurain in the 1993 Giro d’Italia. Konyshev moved to the Dutch squad TVM and had an outstanding career in one-day races. Andrei Tchmil went to ride for Belgian teams and became one of the top one day riders of the 1990s, winning Paris–Roubaix (1994), Milan–San Remo (1999) and the Tour of Flanders (2000).

Women's cycling 
Alfa Lum have been involved in sponsoring women's professional cycling. In the year 2000 the team had Joane Somarriba and Edita Pučinskaitė in the squad as team leaders. Somarriba took the overall at the Grande Boucle while Pučinskaitė took second in the same race. In 2001 Mari Holden joined Somarriba as team leader as Pučinskaitė left. In 2002 Alfa Lum reduced their commitment to women's cycling becoming a co-sponsor and then leaving the sport completely at the end of that season.

References

Further reading
 
 
 
 

Defunct cycling teams based in Italy
Cycling teams established in 1982
Cycling teams disestablished in 1990
Cycling teams based in San Marino
1982 establishments in San Marino